Benjamin is an Indian actor and comedian who has appeared in Tamil language films in supporting roles.

Career
Benjamin made his acting debut through Cheran's Vetri Kodi Kattu (2000), where he played the foul-mouthed brother of Vadivelu's character.

Benjamin had a career breakthrough with Cheran's Autograph (2004) where he played the childhood friend of the lead character who assists him in his search for his former lovers. The success of the film led to his first lead comedy role in Thirupaachi (2005), as the friend of Vijay's character.

In 2020, Benjamin suffered a heart attack and made a public appeal for financial donations from his film industry colleagues.

Selected filmography
Films

Television
Marmadesam - Vidathu Karuppu
Ramany vs Ramany

References

Living people
Male actors in Tamil cinema
21st-century Indian male actors
Indian male film actors
Tamil male actors
Tamil comedians
Indian male comedians
1965 births